Major-General Francis John Duncan  (16 May 1870 – 1960) was a senior British Army officer.

Military career
Educated at Shrewsbury School, Duncan was commissioned into the Royal Scots on 21 September 1889. After serving in the Second Boer War, he became military commandant at Edenburg in South Africa. During the First World War he was deployed as a staff officer with the British Expeditionary Force and then became commander of the 165th Brigade in France January 1916, commander of the 214th Brigade in the UK in April 1917 and commander of 60th Brigade in France in October 1917. He went on to be General Officer Commanding 61st (2nd South Midland) Division in 1918.

Family
In 1905 he married Lili Linder.

References

1870 births
1960 deaths
British Army generals of World War I
Companions of the Order of the Bath
Companions of the Order of St Michael and St George
Companions of the Distinguished Service Order
Royal Scots officers
British Army major generals